Luzhnetskaya Embankment is a street and embankment in Khamovniki District of Moscow along the Moskva River.

Gallery

References

Streets in Moscow